World War I was fought on many fronts around the world from the battlefields of Europe to the far-flung colonies in the Pacific and Africa. While it is most famous for the trench warfare stalemate that existed on Europe's Western Front, in other theatres of combat the fighting was mobile and often involved set-piece battles and cavalry charges. The Eastern Front often took thousands of casualties a day during the major offensive pushes, but it was the West that saw the most concentrated slaughter. It was in the west that the newly industrialized world powers could focus their end products on the military–industrial complex. The deadliest day of the war was during the opening days of the conflict. The Imperial German war council had initiated the Schlieffen Plan which involved multiple armies flooding through the borders of Belgium and France. On August 22, 1914, during the Battle of the Frontiers, five separate French armies engaged the German invaders independently of each other. Across all those battlefields, on that single day, 27,000 French soldiers lost their lives protecting their country.

The term casualty in warfare is often misunderstood. It often refers not to those who are killed on the battlefield but to those who can no longer fight. That can include disabled by injuries, disabled by psychological trauma, captured, deserted, or missing. A casualty is, by definition, a soldier who is no longer available for the immediate battle or campaign, the major consideration in combat. The number of casualties is simply the number of members of a unit who are not available for duty. For example, on March 21, 1918, during the opening day of the German spring offensive, the Germans casualties are broken down into 10,851 killed, 28,778 wounded, 300 POW or taken prisoner for a total of 39,929 casualties. The word casualty has been used in a military context since at least 1513. In this article, the numbers killed refer to those killed in action, killed by disease, or killed by their wounds.

Western Front

Eastern Front

Naval battles

Gallipoli Campaign

Italian Front

Macedonian front

See also
 Surviving American units with the highest percentage of casualties per conflict
 List of maritime disasters in World War I
 World War I casualties
 List of battles with most United States military fatalities
 General Pershing WWI casualty list

Notes

References

Sources
  - Total pages: 224 
 - Total pages: 602 

 - Total pages: 271 

 - Total pages: 38
 - Total pages: 48 
 - Total pages: 323 
 - Total pages: 241 

 

 - Total pages: 319 
 - Total pages: 430 

 - Total pages: 826 
 - Total pages: 176 

 - Total pages: 407 

 - Total pages: 880 

WWI
World War I
Battles
War casualties
World War I-related lists